José Joaquim da Cunha Azeredo Coutinho ( – ) was a Brazilian bishop and the last inquisitor-general of Portugal and Brazil. 

He studied at Coimbra in Portugal, received orders, and soon became prominent both in the church and in politics. In 1794 he was made bishop of Pernambuco. In 1818 he was appointed inquisitor-general, and shortly before his death he was elected to the cortes. He published Ensaio economico sobre o commercio de Portugal e suas colonias (1792), a pamphlet against the proposed abolition of the slave-trade (1788), and a memoir on the conquest of Rio de Janeiro by Duguay-Trouin in 1711.

José Joaquim da Cunha Azeredo Coutinho died on 12 September 1821 in Lisbon.

References

18th-century Roman Catholic bishops in Portugal

19th-century Roman Catholic bishops in Portugal
1742 births
1821 deaths
Created via preloaddraft
People from Campos dos Goytacazes